L’Étoile de Grenade is a ballet divertissement choreographed by Marius Petipa to music by Cesare Pugni. This was the first collaboration between Marius Petipa and the composer Cesare Pugni. Petipa did not receive credit for the production of this ballet in the theatre program.

See also
 List of ballets by title

External links
New York Choreographic Institute website

Ballets by Marius Petipa
Ballets by Cesare Pugni
1855 ballet premieres